Shukran Hussein Gure (born 6 June 1978) is a Kenyan politician. She hails from the Auliyahan subdivision of the Somali Ogaden Darod clan. Gure is a Member of the Kenyan Parliament representing the Garissa County. She was elected to the position in March 2013 on a Wiper Democratic Movement ticket. She is of Somali ethnicity.

References

 she lost her seat in the 2017 elections

1978 births
Living people
Ethnic Somali people
Kenyan people of Somali descent
Members of the 11th Parliament of Kenya
People from Garissa County
St. Catherine University alumni